Abdullah Alizani (also "Abdallah" and "Al-Izani"; عبد الله العزاني; born October 1, 1968) is a wrestler from the Yemen Arab Republic.

Alizani lost in both his first and second rounds at the 1988 Summer Olympics in Men's Light-Flyweight (48 kg), Greco-Roman matches, and was eliminated. He also competed internationally for Yemen at the 1996 Summer Olympics.

Career
Al-Izani competed in the Greco-Roman 48kg contest at the 1996 Summer Olympics, heldin Atlanta, Georgia, United States, he had two fights but lost them both due to grand superiority, they were against Bratan Tsenov from Bulgaria and Tahir Zahidov from Azerbaijan.

References

External links
 

1968 births
Living people
Yemeni male sport wrestlers
Olympic wrestlers of North Yemen
Wrestlers at the 1988 Summer Olympics
Wrestlers at the 1996 Summer Olympics
Wrestlers at the 1998 Asian Games
Asian Games competitors for Yemen